"Sugar Hill" is the debut single by American rapper AZ. It was released on June 20, 1995 via EMI and is from his debut studio album Doe or Die. Recording sessions took place at Chung King Studios and Electric Lady Studios in New York. Produced by L.E.S., the song samples Juicy's "Sugar Free". Miss Jones sung the chorus and provided backing vocals.

The single peaked at number 25 on the US Billboard Hot 100 and number 67 on the UK Singles Chart, making it the rapper's highest charting song. It was certified gold by the Recording Industry Association of America on September 7, 1995.

Track listing

Charts

Certifications

References

External links

1995 songs
1995 debut singles
AZ (rapper) songs
EMI Records singles
Song recordings produced by L.E.S. (record producer)